Stéphane Trésarrieu (born 27 February 1975) is a French motorcycle racer and competes in Grasstrack, Longtrack and Speedway. He is a three times speedway champion of France and eight times grasstrack champion of France.

World Longtrack Championship

Grand-Prix Years
 1998 - 1 app (23rd) 7pts
 2000 - 5 apps (13th) 30pts
 2001 - 4 apps (5th) 46pts
 2002 - 3 apps (13th) 31pts
 2003 - 5 apps (13th) 44pts
 2004 - 5 apps (16th) 27pts
 2005 - 1 app (20th) 14pts
 2006 - 3 apps (6th) 34pts
 2007 - 3 apps (15th) 18pts
 2008 - 3 apps (8th) 37pts
 2009 - 5 apps (Second) 83pts
 2010 - 4 apps (17th) 23pts
 2011 - 6 apps (7th) 75pts
 2012 - 5 apps (13th) 43pts
 2013 - 6 apps (11th) 75pts
 2014 - 4 apps (7th) 44pts
 2015 - 4 apps (10th) 31pts
 2016 - 1 app (21st) 2pts
 2017 - 2 apps (14th) 25pts

Best Grand-Prix Results

  Morizes First 2011, Third 2009
  Marmande Second 2009
  Colomb de Lauzun Third 2002

Team Championship
 2007  Morizes (Third) 18/39pts (Rode with Mathieu Trésarrieu, Christophe Dubernard, Phillipe Ostyn)
 2008  Wertle (6th) 16/27pts (Rode with Jerome Lespinasse, Theo di Palma)
 2009  Eenrum (Third) 19/19pts (Rode with Mathieu Trésarrieu, Phillipe Ostyn, Jerome Lespinasse)
 2010  Morizes (Second) 22/47pts (Rode with Mathieu Trésarrieu, Theo di Palma, Jerome Lespinasse)
 2011  Scheeßel (5th) 8/34pts (Rode with Mathieu Trésarrieu, Theo di Palma, Jerome Lespinasse)
 2012  St. Macaire (Third) 20/42pts (Rode with Mathieu Trésarrieu, Gabrial Dubernard, David Bellego)
 2013  Folkestone (Second) 16/57pts (Rode with Mathieu Trésarrieu, Theo di Palma, Dimitri Bergé)
 2014  Forssa (Third) 18/41pts (Rode with Mathieu Trésarrieu, Theo di Palma)
 2015  Mühldorf (4th) 14/40pts (Rode with Mathieu Trésarrieu, Theo di Palma, Dimitri Berge)
 2016 Did not compete
 2017  Roden (Second) 15/54pts (Rode with Mathieu Trésarrieu, Dimitri Bergé, Gaetan Stella)
 2018  Morizes (Champion) 1/54pts (rode with Mathieu Trésarrieu, David Bellego, Dimitri Bergé)

European Grasstrack Championship

 1993  Eenrum (NSR)
 1994  Cloppenburg (5th) 16pts
 1995  Joure (15th) 3pts
 1996  Colomb de Lauzun (11th) 7pts
 1997 No Competition
 1998 Did not compete
 1999 Semi-finalist
 2000  Colomb de Lauzun (11th) 8pts
 2001  Noordwolde (6th) 13pts
 2002  Berghaupten (9th) 12pts
 2003  La Reole (4th) 14pts
 2004  Eenrum (17th) 4pts
 2005 Semi-finalist
 2006 Semi-finalist
 2007 Semi-finalist
 2008  Siddeburen (CHAMPION) 12pts
 2009  Berghaupten (Second) 16pts
 2010 Semi-finalist
 2011  Thorpe St Peter (14th) 4pts
 2012  Eenrum (8th) 15pts
 2013  Bielefeld (11th) 9pts
 2014 Semi-finalist
 2015 Semi-finalist
 2016 Semi-finalist
 2017 Semi-finalist
 2018  Tayac (9th) 10pts

Family
Stephane has two brothers who also compete in motorcycle racing, they are Mathieu Trésarrieu and Sebastien Trésarrieu.

References

External links

French speedway riders
French motorcycle racers
1975 births
Living people
Individual Speedway Long Track World Championship riders
Sportspeople from Bordeaux